Kila or KILA can refer to:

 Kíla, Irish folk band
 Koila, Kozani, a village in northern Greece
 Kila Marr, a xenologist in the fictional Star Trek universe
 Kerala Institute of Local Administration (KILA)
 Kīla (Buddhism), an iconic ritual dagger and deity
 Kila, Iran, a village in Lorestan Province, Iran
 Kila, Sweden, settlement in Sala Municipality
 KILA-LD, a low-power television station (channel 8) licensed to serve Cherry Valley, California, United States

See also

 CALA (disambiguation)
 Kaila
 Kala (disambiguation)
 Kayla
 Kila Kila Kila
 Kyla (given name)